The Hour of Charm is an American old-time radio music program. It debuted on CBS on May 18, 1934, and had its final broadcast on CBS on May 2, 1948. The program also was broadcast on Armed Forces Radio, and after its network broadcasts ended, a new version was syndicated via transcriptions.

Schedules
The table below shows the program's varied schedules and sponsors during its time on network radio.

Source: On the Air: The Encyclopedia of Old-Time Radio

Personnel
The musical group featured in the program was originally called Phil Spitalny's All-Girl Orchestra. Spitalny directed the group that, as the name implies, was composed only of females. In time, however, the group became so associated with the program that it became known as the Hour of Charm Orchestra.

Violinist Evelyn Kaye was the concertmistress and featured player. On the air, she was identified only by her first name —as was Spitalny's policy with all of his musicians — billed as "Evelyn and Her Magic Violin". She was with the group from its inception until its disbanding, and she married Spitalny in 1946.

Rosalind Green was the initial on-air hostess, a role that Arlene Francis filled later. Announcers were Ken Roberts, Ron Rawson, and Richard Stark. The director was Joseph Ripley.

Critical reception
The trade publication Billboard published two reviews of  The Hour of Charm. The March 7, 1936, review called the program "a tuneful affair, revealing several excellent arrangements, the better ones being of the South American tang ..."

A brief review in the December 31, 1938, issue pointed out several shortcomings of a remote broadcast from the Hotel Biltmore in New York. Daniel Richman described the broadcast as "so laden with arrangements, production trappings, descriptions of the girls' clothes and talents, and so much general excess baggage that it sounded more like the Ford Sunday Evening Symphony than a dance remote."

The August 1, 1942, issue of Billboard reported that Arturo Toscanini considered The Hour of Charm to be his favorite radio program.

Transcribed broadcasts
In 1951, the RCA Thesaurus electrical transcription service launched a new Hour of Charm radio series. Stations that broadcast the program included WFLA AM and FM in Tampa, Florida.

References

External links

Logs
Log of episodes of The Hour of Charm from Jerry Haendiges Vintage Radio Logs
Log of episodes of The Hour of Charm from radioGOLDINdex

Streaming
Audition program No. 5 for The Hour of Charm from the RCA Thesaurus music library
Episodes of The Hour of Charm from Dumb.com
Episodes of The Hour of Charm from the Internet Archive
Episodes of The Hour of Charm from the Old Time Radio Researchers Group Library

1934 radio programme debuts
1948 radio programme endings
1930s American radio programs
1940s American radio programs
CBS Radio programs
NBC radio programs
American music radio programs